The following is a list of educational institutions in Karaikal, India, one of the four districts of the Union Territory of Puducherry.

Medical Colleges
 Jawaharlal Institute of Postgraduate Medical Education and Research
 Vinayaga Mission Medical College

Engineering and agricultural colleges
 Bharathiyar College of Engineering and Technology
 National Institute of Technology Puducherry
 R.V.S College of Engineering and Technology
 Perunthalaivar Kamarajar Institute of Engineering and Technology
 Pandit Jawaharlal Nehru College of Agriculture and Research Institute

University
 Pondicherry University

General colleges
 Aringar Anna Govt. Arts College
 Avvaiyar Govt College for Women
 RVS Arts and Science College, Kalikuppam
 Karaikal college of Education
 Don Bosco College (Arts & Science), Thamanangudy, Ambagarathur

ITI
 Karaikal Govt. Polytechnic
 Govt. I.T.I. for Women
 Govt. I.T.I. for Men

Schools
 VMI - Vruksha Montessori Internationale
 St.Mary's Higher Secondary school
 Nirmala Ranee Girls Higher Secondary School
 SRVS national school
 brightacademy
 Annai Theresa Govt. Girls Higher secondary school
 Adarsh concept school, Kottuchery
 Aiyas English School
 Cauvery Public School
 Crescent High School, Ambagarathur
 Don Bosco Higher Secondary School, Nedungadu
 Good Shepherd English School, Melakasakudi
 Govindasamy Pillai High School
 Govt. French school
 Govt. Girls high school, Thalatheru
 Govt. Girls high school, T.R. Pattinam.
 Govt. high school, kovilpathu.
 Govt. higher secondary school, T.R. Pattinam
 Govt. higher secondary school, Thenur
 Govt. higher secondary school, Niravy
 Govt. higher secondary school, Nedungadu
 Govt. higher secondary school, Kottucherry
 Govt. high school, Karaikalmedu
 Govt. high school, Sethur
 Govt. high school, Poovam
 Govt. high school, Kottucherry
 Govt. high school, Thalatheru
 Govt. high school, T.R. Pattinam
 Govt. high school, Kurumbakaram
 Govt. high school, Vizhithiyur
 Govt. high school, Akkaraivattam
 Jawahar Navodaya Vidyalaya
 Kendriya Vidyalaya
 K.M.K. Kannaiya Pillai Memorial School
 M.E.S. High School, Masthan Palli Street
 Murugathal Achi Govt. Girls higher secondary school
 ONGC public school
 Regional Perfect Higher Secondary School, Nedungadu
 Swami Vivekananda higher secondary school, Ambagarathur
 St.Mary's Higher Secondary school
 Servite high school, Kottucherry
 St. Joseph French cluny
 Thanthai Periyar Govt Higher Secondary School
 Thiruvalluvar Govt Higher Secondary school, Ambagarathur
 Iqra Nursery & Primary School
 Green World Management Consultancy & Training Institute
 Galaxy Indian High School, Bismi Nagar
 Universal Academy, Niravy

External links
 Cresco cafe

  Pajancoa & RI
  Karaikal Official Site
 
 http://www.greenwgroup.com/_

Institutions in Karaikal
Karaikal district
Puducherry-related lists